Liam Philip Smith (born 11 May 1997) is a South African cricketer. He made his first-class debut for Sussex against South Africa A on 14 June 2017.

Prior to his first-class debut, he was named in South Africa's squad for the 2016 Under-19 Cricket World Cup. In the opening match of the tournament, he made a century against Bangladesh.

References

External links
 

1997 births
Living people
South African cricketers
Sussex cricketers
Cricketers from Johannesburg